Major Sir John Eugene Clauson, KCMG, CVO (13 November 1866 – 31 December 1918) was a British Army officer and colonial administrator. He was Lieutenant-Governor and Chief Secretary to Government of the Island of Malta and its Dependencies from 1911 to 1914, and High Commissioner of Cyprus from 1915 until his death.

He was appointed a Commander of the Royal Victorian Order in 1912 and Knight Commander of the Order of St Michael and St George in the 1913 New Year Honours.

His eldest son was Sir Gerard Clauson, Assistant Under-Secretary of State at the Colonial Office from 1940 to 1951.

References 

Royal Engineers officers
Members of the Inner Temple
1866 births
1918 deaths
Knights Commander of the Order of St Michael and St George
Commanders of the Royal Victorian Order